List of rulers of the Akan state of Dwaben (Juaben)

See also
Akan people
Ghana
Gold Coast
Lists of incumbents

Rulers
Ghanaian royalty
Lists of African rulers